Ole Bouman (born 1960, Amersfoort) is a Dutch German historian, writer, curator in urbanism design and architecture. Bouman is the founding director of Design Society, an initiative of China Merchants Group and the Victoria and Albert Museum in Shenzhen, which opened in December 2017.

Life and career

Early career 
Born to German and Dutch parents from cities that were destroyed, Ole Bouman has been fascinated by post-war reconstruction and the way architecture builds society since a young age. He continued his pursuit of this childhood fascination through his academic exploration in the history of architecture at the University of Amsterdam, where he earned degrees in Cultural History and Art & Archeology. Bouman then began his career in the Netherlands as an art and architecture critic with De Groene Amsterdammer, where he wrote a weekly column between 1987 and 1997. As a visiting student at Delft University of Technology (TU Delft) from 1987 to 1988, Bouman organized and gave lectures on architectural theory alongside acclaimed academics and architects including Ernest Mandel, Amos Rapoport, Giancarlo de Carlo, and Kenneth Frampton. He compiled and elaborated the materials from his many academic dialogues at Delft and published them in 1994 as The Invisible in Architecture, a comprehensive and critical overview of contemporary architecture co-authored by Roemer van Toorn.

Archis Magazine
In 1996, Bouman was appointed editor-in-chief of the international architecture magazine Archis, and turned it into a journal for architecture, urbanism and visual culture. In 2000, right before Archis Magazine was to be liquidated by its owner, the Netherlands Architecture Institute, and an ensuing debate in the Dutch national parliament, Bouman became the founding director of the Archis Foundation, an NGO active in publishing, consultancy, and establishing connections between local design communities in need of expertise and the Archis global knowledge network. During his time at Archis, Bouman also curated various exhibitions, including:
 RealSpace in QuickTimes (1996): An official Dutch exhibition at the XIX Triennale di Milano with an installation that reflected on the future of architecture in the digital age, as well as the essay RealSpace in QuickTimes on the effect that digital technology will have on the idea of mankind and how this technology expresses itself in buildings.
 Egotecture (1998): An exhibition in the Museum Boijmans van Beuningen featuring works depicting 500 years of interaction between space projections and the human self-image, sourced from the vast museum collection.
 Manifesta 3: Borderline Syndrome, Energies of Defense (2000): The International Biennial of Contemporary Art in Ljubljana, co-curated by Francesco Bonami, Maria Lhavajova, and Katrin Rhomberg.
 Freeze (2000): An exhibition at the Arti et Amicitiae gallery in Amsterdam that attempted to enhance individual awareness of the posthuman condition, by playing with the extreme shortness of our attention spans.
 Trans-ports (2000–2002): An interactive visitor pavilion that aimed to integrate different potentials of space, such as reprogrammability, interactivity, structural animation, and the merging of digitality and physicality by a both built and online interface, in collaboration with Kas Oosterhuis.
During his time at Archis, Bouman started Archis RSVP events, a series of response-based events that were organized all over the world by Archis in collaboration with the AMO (the research bureau of OMA).

Volume Magazine
In 2005, supported by Rem Koolhaas and Mark Wigley, Bouman revamped Archis into Volume, an independent magazine that pushes "architecture to go beyond itself" and to challenge its limits and discover new roles in society. He concluded his term at Volume with a special issue, explaining “unsolicited architecture,” a practice of design “not waiting the phone to ring” but proactively searching for opportunities for architecture beyond “client, budget, location and program”. This issue exposed the results of his teachings at MIT.

Netherlands Architecture Institute 
After running Volume, Bouman became the director of the Netherlands Architecture Institute (NAi), which he turned into a civic institution, positioning architecture in direct response to societal needs. During his incumbency, Bouman also revamped NAi into an accessible and popular architecture museum named "New NAi". This effort was exemplified by a major renovation, finished in 2011, as well as the launch of a new activist agenda for the discipline of architecture called Architecture of Consequence, collaborating among others with AAO curated by Lina Stergiou. Based on his experience at MIT, Bouman relaunched The Studio of Unsolicited Architecture (SUA) at the NAi in late 2010 to shed light on the difficulties facing the architecture profession that suffered from a major backlash in the wake of the credit crisis presented at various cities. Bouman was also active as the commissioner and later curator of the Dutch entry to the La Biennale di Venezia from 2008 to 2012, in which he presented his thinking on architecture and society through titles such as Archiphoenix, Faculties for Architecture (2008), Vacant NL (2010), and Re-set, New Wings for Architecture (2012). In 2011, Bouman started to engage in practical collaborations with China by supervising Housing with a Mission, a collaborative project between Dutch and Chinese architects focusing on design solutions for social housing in China together with the Chinese developer Vanke. Bouman left the NAi on the eve of a government enforced merger with two other institutions to represent the government defined "top sector" of creative industries which he disagreed.

Urbanism/Architecture Bi-City Biennale of Shenzhen/Hong Kong 
In 2013, Bouman was appointed the creative director of the Urbanism/Architecture Bi-City Biennale of Shenzhen/Hong Kong (UABB). Bouman redeveloped an industrial plant into a culture facility for the Biennale called "Value Factory", which was occupied by a variety of international cultural institutions including MoMA, V&A, Droog Design, Sao Paulo Biennial and MAXXI. In 2014, Bouman worked with curator Juulia Kauste to stage the Finnish entry Re-Creation to La Biennale di Venezia. The piece, which aimed to foster a new culture of making, was an integral part of the UABB and was later presented in the Aalto pavilion at the biennale de Venezia.

Design Society 
Since 2015, Bouman has served as the founding director of Design Society, an initiative developed by China Merchants Group and the Victoria and Albert Museum in Shekou, Shenzhen. More than a traditional exhibition space, Design Society has been set up as a hub bringing together a museum, a theatre, a multifunctional hall, a private gallery, a café, a restaurant and many different shopping areas, including one space where the creations of talented young Chinese designers are for sale. The organization aims to build a diverse public program with the mission to activate design as a social catalyst. Bouman currently works as urban curator at China Merchants to disseminate the lessons for Shenzhen for a large scale of urban developments throughout China.

Publications 
 And justice for all… (1994)
 The Invisible in Architecture (1994)
 Destination Future (1996)
 RealSpace in QuickTimes: Architecture and Digitization (1997)
Egotecture (1998)
 On the Age of Two Millennia: Essays on the Future of Architecture (1999)
 3D>2D: The Designers Republic's Adventures in and Out of Architecture (2001)
 Kas Oosterhuis (2002)
 The Battle for Time (2003)
Architecture, Liquid, Gas (2005)
 Disappearing Architecture: From Real to Virtual to Quantum (2005)
 Al Manakh (2007)
 Architecture of Consequence (2009)
 Testify! – the Consequences of Architecture (2011)
 Dutch Architecture in 250 Highlights (2012)
 Value Factory Academy: A School as Risk (2014, unpublished)
 The Making of Design Society (2017)
 Wang Shu and Amateur Architecture Studio (2017)

References 

1960 births
Living people
Dutch curators
Dutch art critics
Dutch art historians